Agostino Li Vecchi (born 24 October 1970) is an Italian basketball player. He competed in the men's tournament at the 2000 Summer Olympics.

References

External links
 

1970 births
Living people
Italian men's basketball players
Olympic basketball players of Italy
Basketball players at the 2000 Summer Olympics
Sportspeople from Cosenza